2022 Kebbi massacres may refer to:

Dankade massacre, a January 2022 massacre in Kebbi State, Nigeria
March 2022 Kebbi massacres